Tomáš Okleštěk (born 21 February 1987) is a Czech football player who currently plays for 1. SC Znojmo.

Career
Ahead of the 2019-20 season, Okleštěk returned to 1. SC Znojmo.

Honours
Czech Rupublic U-21
FIFA U-20 World Cup runner-up (1) 2007

References

External links
 
 Guardian Football

1987 births
Living people
Footballers from Brno
Czech footballers
Czech expatriate footballers
Czech First League players
Czech National Football League players
First Professional Football League (Bulgaria) players
FC Zbrojovka Brno players
FK Čáslav players
1. SC Znojmo players
PFC Minyor Pernik players
FK Jablonec players
MFK Karviná players
MFK Vítkovice players
Czech expatriate sportspeople in Bulgaria
Expatriate footballers in Bulgaria
Association football midfielders
Czech Republic youth international footballers
SK Hanácká Slavia Kroměříž players